Hand of Death or Man of Death (Italian: La mano della morta) is a 1949 Italian historical melodrama film directed by Carlo Campogalliani and starring María Martín,  Adriano Rimoldi and Carlo Ninchi. It was shot at the Icet Studios in Milan.

Cast
 María Martín as Satanella 
 Adriano Rimoldi as conte Orazio Altieri  
 Carlo Ninchi as Simone Bossi  
 Renato De Carmine as Flavio Altieri  
 Germana Paolieri as contessa Altieri  
 Saro Urzì as zingaro Marco  
 Marisa Mari as Lucia Altieri  
 Ernesto Sabbatini 
 Raffaele Pindinelli as usuraio Schultz  
 Domenico Viglione Borghese 
 Lina Volonghi as Carmela Caputo  
 Marcello Giorda as Direttore d'orchestra  
 Fernando Farese as Fernando Tibaldi  
 Silvio Bagolini as Ufficiale 
 Tina Spezia as Evelina  
 Gianni Guarnieri as impresario Gemelli  
 Nerio Bernardi as senatore Tibaldi  
 Alberto Archetti 
 Gianni Cavalieri 
 Egisto Olivieri 
 Silvana Calvi 
 Arrigo Peri 
 Giuliana Pinelli 
 Nera Bruni 
 Darma Doriano 
 Ernesto Nelli

References

Bibliography
 Bayman, Louis. The Operatic and the Everyday in Postwar Italian Film Melodrama. Edinburgh University Press, 2014.

External links

1949 films
1940s historical drama films
Italian historical drama films
1940s Italian-language films
Films directed by Carlo Campogalliani
Films scored by Giovanni Fusco
Italian black-and-white films
Melodrama films
1949 drama films
1940s Italian films